Siege of Jülich may refer to:

Siege of Jülich (1610)
Siege of Jülich (1621–1622)